CFXM-FM 104.9 MHz is a Canadian radio station that broadcasts a French language commercial easy listening format in Granby, Quebec. The station is branded as M105.

Licensed in 1997, the station is owned by La Coopérative de travail de la radio de Granby, which was founded by former employees of CHEF 1450, which ceased operations in 1996.

References

External links
Official website
 

Fxm
Fxm
Granby, Quebec
Fxm
Radio stations established in 1997
1997 establishments in Quebec